DGH may refer to:
 dGH, the Degree of General Hardness, a measure of the hardness of water.
 Denver General Hospital, the former name of Denver Health Medical Center
 Dghwede language, a Chadic language of Nigeria
 Directorate General of Highways, an agency in Taiwan
 District general hospital
 Doctors for Global Health